Wiska Waqi (Aymara wiska wool rope, waqi part, portion, "rope part", Hispanicized spelling Huiscahuaque) is a  mountain in the Wansu mountain range in the Andes of Peru. It is situated in the Cusco Region, Chumbivilcas Province, Santo Tomás District. Wiska Waqi lies northwest of Hatun Waychawi.

References 

Mountains of Cusco Region